Kolkata railway station (formerly known as Chitpur station) is the newest of the five intercity railway stations serving Howrah and Kolkata, West Bengal, India,  the others are Sealdah station in Kolkata and Howrah station, Shalimar station and  in Howrah. Kolkata station is situated in the Chitpur locality of North Kolkata.

History
The place where the station is situated was formerly a large goods yard. The present car and bus parking areas, as well as the path to the station, formed part of a coal loading yard. The present-day platforms were once used as goods lines and formed part of the large Chitpur Rail Yard.

Plan & location
In 2000, the first plans were made to use this area as a railway station, since the rapid growth of long-distance passengers was overcrowding the Sealdah station. Due to limitations of space, new platform construction is restricted at Sealdah. Two new platforms (9A & 9B) constructed between 2004 and 2005 proved insufficient. Due to its central position in Kolkata, the Sealdah station is too busy for suburban train traffic. To overcome this problem, Eastern Railways suggested constructing another large railway station in Kolkata, to cater mostly to long-distance trains. The decision to build a terminal at Chitpur came after a lot of deliberation and a process of elimination. Different locations were suggested for the station site. Three years ago,  was suggested as a possible location. The idea was shelved owing to technical difficulties involving the construction of a bridge over the Hooghly river from Bauria to Budge Budge. Then there was Shalimar, in Howrah district, which was already a goods terminal operating under the South Eastern Railway. In fact, a passenger service on a trial basis was also started from there through two pairs of trains. But the project could not take off owing to certain problems relating to infrastructure and the considerable distance of the terminal from Kolkata proper. Chitpur was decided upon finally and approved by the Railway Ministry in 2003–04. Certain inherent advantages helped in the selection of this place. Other than being located in the heart of Kolkata, Chitpur has already functioned as an important rail yard for around a century. Moreover, unlike in the case of Majerhat and Shalimar, the huge property in and around the place belongs to the Railways. The proposal has been accepted by the Kolkata Metropolitan Development Authority (KMDA), and on 15 May 2003, West Bengal Chief Minister Buddhadeb Bhattacharjee laid the foundation stone for the project.

Construction history
Construction started in 2004. The tracks from the coal-yard were closed first, and then a large portion of electrified goods tracks were shut down. Those tracks, masts and wires were demolished. Next, the Dumdum–Majherhat link rail line's (Kolkata Circular Railway) track was temporarily re-aligned. This action permitted the construction of platforms, station buildings and a parking area to begin. After construction was completed, the circular rail tracks were aligned as before, now via the new station. Other tracks were re-aligned, and completely electrified for passenger coaches shunting (up to side of Tala station). Tracks in the opposite direction, which were not electrified and underutilized, were re-laid, re-aligned and fully electrified for goods trains (with wagon to lorry transfer facility). Part of the former electrified goods lines, which were closed, now entered use as a coach siding.

After these, the official inauguration occurred in January 2006.

Station layout

Services
The station is linked to the Sealdah–Ranaghat–Krishnanagar–Berhampore–Lalgola line and is served by the Eastern Railway for trains to Naihati, Bandel, Kalyani Simanta, Gede, Shantipur, Krishnanagar, Berhampore, Lalgola, Dankuni, Barddhaman, Katwa, Bongaon, Hasnabad and others. The number of suburban trains is lower than long-distance trains. This station runs many long-distance express trains including two pairs of Garib Rath Express, Khwaja Garib Nawaz Madar–Kolkata Express etc. and one long-distance passenger train – Lalgola Passenger. There are five platforms, among them Platform 1 & 2 is used by only suburban trains and Platform 3,4 & 5 are used by long-distance trains. The station is operated by the Eastern Railway. The international trains of eastern India Maitree Express and Bandhan Express which runs towards Bangladesh, also departed from here.

The Maharajas' Express departed from this station for the first time at 20 March 2010.
Nearest Metro Stations are Shyambazar metro station and Belgachia metro station.

Gallery

See also
 Indian Railways
 Howrah station
 Shalimar station
 
 Sealdah station
 Kolkata Suburban Railway
 Kolkata Metro
 Trams in Kolkata
 Bangladesh–India relations
 Maitree Express
 Bandhan Express

References

External links

 website

Railway stations in Kolkata
Railway junction stations in West Bengal
Sealdah railway division
Railway stations opened in 2006
Kolkata Suburban Railway stations
Kolkata Circular Railway